Oregon Route 422 (OR 422) is an Oregon state highway running from Modoc Point Road near Klamath Agency to US 97 near Chiloquin. OR 422 is known as the Chiloquin Highway No. 422 (see Oregon highways and routes).

OR 422 was established in 2002 as part of Oregon's project to assign route numbers to highways that previously were not assigned.  The route is mentioned on signage along U.S. 97, but no signage exists on OR 422 itself or at its junction with OR 62 as of July 2017.

OR 422 has an unsigned spur in Chiloquin, which runs .

Route description 
At the intersection of Chocktoot Street and Chiloquin Road in Chiloquin, OR 422S heads southeast along Chocktoot Street and OR 422 turns southwest along Chiloquin Road, ending at an intersection with US 97 approximately  beyond the city limits.

History 
The Chiloquin Highway No. 422 was approved for designation as a secondary highway on November 13, 1931. It was designated on December 6, 1933. The OR 422 designation was applied to the Chiloquin Highway on May 14, 2002.

Major intersections

Spur route 

Oregon Route 422S (OR 422S) is a spur route of OR 422 in Chiloquin. OR 422S is known as the Chiloquin Spur No. 488. OR 422S begins at the intersection of Chocktoot Street and Chiloquin Road in Chiloquin and heads southeast, ending just past the Williamson River.

References 

422
Transportation in Klamath County, Oregon